The Écossaise (in French, "Scottish") is a musical form and a type of contradanse in a Scottish style – a Scottish country dance at least in name – that was popular in France and Great Britain at the end of the 18th century and at the beginning of the 19th. Despite the Écossaise mimicking a Scottish country dance, it is actually French in origin. The écossaise was usually danced in 2/4 time in two lines, with men facing the women. As the dance is executed, couples progress to the head of the line.

Écossaise compositions were mainly written for solo piano, so that couples could dance to it. The musical form was also adopted by some classical composers, including Ludwig van Beethoven, (WoO 83 and WoO 86 for piano and WoO 22 and WoO 23, now lost, for military band); Franz Schubert, (D.145, 158, 299, 421, 511, 529, 643, 697, 734, 735, 781, 782, 783, 816, and 977); Frédéric Chopin (Op. 72 number 3) and Cécile Chaminade's Écossaise, Op. 151.

This music usually includes significant dynamic contrasts, with fortissimos and pianissimos being very close together, contributing to its unique dynamic energy. They sometimes have a central tune upon which some of the strains are based. An écossaise by Johann Nepomuk Hummel is included in the second volume for piano in the Suzuki Method.

References

 New Grove Dictionary 2001 p. 870–871
 Suzuki Piano School, Volume 2, Revised Edition 1995 p.5

External links
 Watch Écossaise on the piano on YouTube
 International Music Score Library Project: Ecossaises

Contra dance
Dance forms in classical music
Scottish country dance